Patrick D. Creamer (July 9, 1892 – March 31, 1949) was an American politician and a trainman.

Creamer was born in Saint Paul, Minnesota and graduated from St. Michael's Parochial School. He went to University of St. Thomas and to Notre Dame Law School. Creamer served in the United States Army during World War I. Creamer lived in Saint Paul, Minnesota with his wife, Edna (nee: Kopp, of Shakopee, MN), and children, Mary Creamer Landy, Patricia Creamer Emerson, Patrick Creamer, George "Roman" Creamer, Robert Stanley Creamer, William Creamer, and Kathleen Creamer Rezek. Creamer had worked as a trainman for the Great Northern Railway. Creamer served in the Minnesota House of Representatives from 1945 until his death in 1949.

References

1892 births
1949 deaths
Politicians from Saint Paul, Minnesota
Military personnel from Minnesota
University of St. Thomas (Minnesota) alumni
Notre Dame Law School alumni
Great Northern Railway (U.S.)
Members of the Minnesota House of Representatives